The men's vault (or "horse vault" or "long horse") competition at the 1936 Summer Olympics was held at the Waldbühne on 10 August. It was the sixth appearance of the event. There were 110 competitors from 14 nations, with each nation sending a team of up to 8 men. The event was won by Alfred Schwarzmann of Germany, the nation's first victory in the event since 1896 and second overall. Eugen Mack of Switzerland earned silver, the first man to win multiple medals in the event (he had won gold in 1928). Another member of the host German team, Matthias Volz, took bronze.

Background

This was the sixth appearance of the event, which is one of the five apparatus events held every time there were apparatus events at the Summer Olympics (no apparatus events were held in 1900, 1908, 1912, or 1920). Four of the 10 gymnasts from 1932 returned: gold medalist Savino Guglielmetti of Italy, silver medalist Al Jochim of the United States, fourth-place finisher Einari Teräsvirta of Finland, sixth-place finisher István Pelle of Hungary, seventh-place finisher Miklós Péter of Hungary, and tenth-place finisher Heikki Savolainen of Finland. Also returning was 1928 gold medalist Eugen Mack of Switzerland, who had also won the first world championship in the apparatus in 1934. Alfred Schwarzmann of host Germany was among the favorites as well.

Austria, Japan, and Romania each made their debut in the men's vault. The United States made its fifth appearance, most of any nation, having missed only the inaugural 1896 Games.

Competition format

The gymnastics format returned to the aggregation format used in 1928 but not in 1932. The event used a "vaulting horse" aligned parallel to the gymnast's run (rather than the modern "vaulting table" in use since 2004). Each nation entered a team of eight gymnasts (Bulgaria had only 7). All entrants in the gymnastics competitions (Neri of Italy did not compete in the vault) performed both a compulsory exercise and a voluntary exercise, with the scores summed to give a final total. Two vaults were done for each, with the better score counted. The scores in the vault were added to the other apparatus scores to give individual all-around scores; the top six individual scores on each team were summed to give a team all-around score. No separate finals were contested.

The compulsory vault was described in the Official Report:

Schedule

Results

References

Men's vault
1936
Men's 1936
Men's events at the 1936 Summer Olympics